Skilpadjies is a traditional South African food, also known by other names such as  and .

Dishes such as skilpadjies had already been made by the ancient Romans and the German recipe for calf's liver in caul fat appears in the book "Das Buoch von guoter Spise".

It is a very rich, high cholesterol and fatty food; the consumers normally eat some starchy food in the form of mealie pap or toasted bread with the skilpadjies, so as not to attract some symptoms of over-indulgence.

See also

 List of African dishes
 List of lamb dishes
 List of meatball dishes
 Boerewors
 Meat chop
 Meat on the bone
 Steak
 Pork steak

References

South African cuisine
Offal
Lamb dishes
Meatballs